Killjoy Goes to Hell (also known as Killjoy 4) is a 2012 American black comedy slasher film and the fourth installment in the Killjoy series of movies by Full Moon.

A Sequel titled "Killjoy's Psycho Circus" was released in 2016 alongside the release of Evil Bong High-5.

Plot
The film begins in a deserted snowy desert. An Old Hag living in a dusty shack is being paid a prize by a Bailiff for conjuring up Killjoy. After Killjoy is summoned, the Bailiff appears and chokes Killjoy out. Killjoy wakes up in an electric chair and is tortured while being asked if he pleads innocent or guilty. Meanwhile, on Earth, it's been three years since the events of the previous film, and Sandie is still locked up in the Essex County Mental Asylum and is still questioned by Detective Grimley and Detective Ericson about the missing bodies of Zilla, the Professor, Rojer and Erica. She only responds with laughter, and Dr. Simmons informs the detectives that her brain is always in the stage of laughter, and cannot figure out what is causing her to do this, but from the evidence in the Professor's house, and his relationship with Michael from the first film, Detective Ericson believes that the legend of Killjoy might be real after all. Meanwhile, the Bailiff takes Killjoy into an elevator down to Hell, where the courtroom is under Beelzebub's control. Killjoy is on trial for the crime of being too soft and not scary, as he let his last victim, Sandie, escape from his realm. The accuser is Jezabeth, the Devil's Advocate, who was once in a relationship with Killjoy a while ago before he dumped her.

Killjoy is found guilty and is stripped of his malice buffoon and his powers. In Hell Jail, he meets Skid Mark, a human demonic clown who idolizes Killjoy, but has a secret agenda to take his position. He offers to become Killjoy's attorney, and with what little left of human blood he has left, conjures up Punchy, Freakshow who is missing his little brother, and Batty Boop, who still has a grudge at Killjoy for vaporizing her. She recognizes Skid Mark, but can't remember him. In the first court hearing, the trio are brought to the stands and questioned by Jezabeth, but everything goes to Hell as Punchy only speaks Polari, Freakshow's a mime, and Batty Boop gets Killjoy to apologize to her in front of everyone, not to mention Skid Mark's failure as an attorney. Because of this, nearly half of Killjoy's fifty-three names are crossed out by Scribe, the court's stenographer, which makes Killjoy weaker and erases them from existence. Back on earth, Detective Ericson and Dr. Simmons begin to notice that the Professor's evidence on Killjoy is disappearing, and they can't remember them either. They decide to meet up with Detective Grimley and Sandie back at the Asylum to discuss what's going on.

Meanwhile, in Hell, Punchy begins to organize a revolt against the court with the rest of the demonic clowns to help Killjoy, and Freakshow goes to the Old Hag's to find materials for a new bionic brother when he notices she has a magic mirror, but is only granted access to it if he sleeps with her. He brings the materials back to Batty Boop, who conjoins him a new brother and tells her about the mirror, and Batty Boop decides to help Killjoy by entering the mirror to Earth and bringing Sandie to Hell to prove Killjoy guilty. Batty tracks down Sandie's location and she and Freakshow enter the mirror and end up in the asylum, where Freakshow kills the Security Guard, Jim, and Batty kills Det. Grimley. Sandie tries to escape but Batty catches her and pushes her into the mirror. Dr. Simmons finds Jim dead along with Sandie's straitjacket and thinks she did it. Freakshow is about to kill Det. Ericson, but is summoned back to Hell, leaving Ericson behind scared and wounded. Back in Hell, Beelzebub takes Killjoy to the elevator and takes him to Oblivion, the Final Circle of Hell, an area of nothing, to show him where he'll be for the rest of eternity if he loses. He also leaves out a box on the desk in the courtroom for Killjoy, which he claims is insurance.

The next court hearing, Killjoy fires Skid Mark out of anger and decides to represent himself. Batty brings Sandie to the stands, in clown mode, and Sandie recaps the events to Jezabeth. Killjoy asks Sandie how she felt afterwards, and goes into vivid detail on what Killjoy did, convincing Beelzebub that he is in fact evil. The only thing left to convince him is the Trial of Combat, where Killjoy has to fight to the death with an opponent, which is Skid Mark. Batty Boop recognizes Skid Mark as one of her victims, who roofied her and raped her, leaving behind only one 'love bite' on him: an infection. Skid Mark turns into a monster, and claims whoever wins gets to keep Batty. An unnamed Clown Observer hands Killjoy a bag of tricks, compliments of Punchy and the clowns, which is ineffective. Batty tells Sandie if Killjoy loses, she won't be able to get out of Hell, so Sandie hands Killjoy his malice and crushes Skid Mark's head off. The Clowns revolt in the courtroom, where Batty kills Jezabeth and Punchy kills Bailiff. Beelzebub, in a fit of anger, incinerates everyone but Punchy, Freakshow, Sandie, Batty and Killjoy before disappearing. Killjoy opens the box, and presses a button, which will self-destruct Hell in a minute. The group escapes in the elevator up to Earth, where the clown posse pursue Sandie in the streets.

Additional footage
During Sandie's recap of Killjoy 3, there are three scenes shown in the montage that are not in the final cut of the previous film. These scenes go by fast, so the only way to see them is to play the montage slow motion and analyze each scene closely. The first scene shows the shaman outside the living room window as Sandie and Rojer clean up, but when Rojer senses his presence and turns, the shaman is gone. The second one takes place shortly after that, where Rojer is making advances towards Sandie in bed, but she turns him down. The third one occurs when Killjoy tries to get the mirror to work, where he calls technical services, and appears to get into a heated argument with the operator, but Batty calms him down. Why these scenes were cut out or not left in a deleted scenes section is unknown.

Cast

Evil Clowns
 Trent Haaga as Killjoy The Demonic Clown
 Victoria De Mare as Batty Boop The Sexy Clown
 Al Burke as Punchy The Clown
 Tai Chan Ngo as Freakshow The Mime Clown
 John Karyus as Skid Mark The Clown
 Daniel Del Pozza as Dirty The Clown
 Derek Jacobsen as Dreadlock The Clown
 Vincent Bilancio as Tramp The Clown
 Nakai Nelson as Switchblade Sinister The Clown / Voice of Destruction
 David Cohen as Clown Observer
 Leroy Patterson as Hillbilly Hobo The Clown / Monster Skid Mark
 Tim Chizmar as White Face The Clown
 Denzil Meyers as Harlequin The Clown

Devils
 Stephen F. Cardwell as Beelzebub
 Samantha Holman as Court Observer
 Mindy Robinson as Red Devil Girl
 Jenny Allford as Blue Devil Girl
 Aqueela Zoll as Jezabeth
 Jim Tavaré as Scribe
 Juan Patricia as Exploded Observer
 Ian Roberts as Bailiff
 Lisa Goodman as Old Hag

People From Earth
 Jessica Whitaker as Sandie
 Cecil Burroughs as Detective Grimley
 Jason Robert Moore as Detective Ericson
 Randy Mermell as Dr. Simmons
 Raymond James Calhoun as Security Guard

Release
The film was released on October 6, 2012 in the USA, and was eventually released under the title Killer Clown In the United Kingdom in 2013.

Sequel
In 2016, Charles Band announced a Kickstarter Campaign to help fund the two films "Killjoy's Psycho Circus" and "Evil Bong High-5!" Below is the full synopsis.

"Killjoy, the demon of vengeance, trickster god and killer clown has finally made it to Earth! Along with his gruesome crew Freakshow, Punchy and the sexy/psychotic Batty Boop, Killjoy is free to terrorize mortals in new and excruciating ways. But two years down the road Killjoy discovers that life on Earth is a drag, filled with inconveniences such as eating, breathing, taxes and immigration issues. His crew has left for other jobs, and Batty Boop has gone her own way after a bitter lover's quarrel. Not to mention that Killjoy is now semi-mortal! Meanwhile, back in hell, Beelzebub is on trial for letting Killjoy escape. The only way that Beelzebub can redeem himself is to trap Killjoy's spirit and bring it back in a box. For this mission he is granted a monumental spaceship capable of destroying entire cities! Killjoy has finally settled in, starring in his own web series called PSYCHO CIRCUS, as well as running a movie and merchandise company with the notorious Hambo the Ranch Hand. The challenges of being a producer are nothing compared to the challenges of staying alive after Beelzebub's assassins appear to kill the demon clown and capture his spirit. Killjoy will have to find a way to reunite his gang of clowns in order to defeat Beelzebub and his minions! It all comes together in an epic battle in KILLJOY'S PSYCHO CIRCUS!!!"

External links
 

Killjoy (film series)
2012 films
American comedy horror films
American slasher films
2010s comedy horror films
Blaxploitation films
Horror films about clowns
2012 comedy films
2010s English-language films
2010s American films